Nob Island is an island about 1 km east of Cape Grenville in the Great Barrier Reef Marine Park Queensland, Australia, in Temple Bay about 200 km north-east of Kutini-Payamu National Park and Lockhart River on Cape York Peninsula. It is around 1 hectares or 0.01 square km in size.

This island is part of Home Islands.

References

Islands on the Great Barrier Reef